Bellshill (pronounced "Bells hill") is a town in North Lanarkshire in Scotland,  southeast of Glasgow city centre and  west of Edinburgh. Other nearby localities are Motherwell  to the south, Hamilton  to the southwest, Viewpark  to the west, Holytown  to the east and Coatbridge  to the north. The town of Bellshill itself (including the villages of Orbiston and Mossend) has a population of about 20,650. From 1996 to 2016, it was considered to be part of the Greater Glasgow metropolitan area; since then it is counted as part of a continuous suburban settlement anchored by Motherwell with a total population of around 125,000.

History

The earliest record of Bellshill's name is handwritten on a map by Timothy Pont dated 1596 although the letters are difficult to distinguish. It's possible it reads Belſsill with the first s being an old-fashioned long s. The site is recorded as being east of "Vdinſtoun" and north of "Bothwel-hauch" (which confusingly is above "Orbeſton" on Pont's map). The name can also been seen on another map, which was derived from Pont's work, made by the Dutch cartographer Joan Blaeu where the place is called "Belmil". The village consisted of a row of quarry workers' houses owned by Mr. Bell, who owned a stone quarry to the south of Belmill. Charles Ross' map of 1773 has "Belsihill" marked north of Crosgates and Orbiston. About 1810, this new settlement took on the name Bellshill and continued to grow. It absorbed nearby villages such as Nesnas, Black Moss and Sykehead. Bellshill was on the road which linked Glasgow and Edinburgh.

According to the first Statistical Account, in the late 1700s the parish of Bothwell, which encompasses modern Bellshill, was a centre of hand-loom weaving with 113 weavers recorded. Only 50 colliers were listed. A hundred or so years later, these occupations had changed places in degree of importance to the area economy.  With the introduction of new machinery in the mid 19th century, many cottage weavers lost their livelihood. Demand for coal to feed British industry meant that by the 1870s, 20 deep pits were in operation in the area.

The first mine to open (and the last to close in 1953) was the Thankerton mine. Others followed swiftly and rapidly increased the size of the town, even attracting a steady stream of immigrants from abroad, particularly Ireland and Lithuania, so much so that the town is sometimes referred to as 'Little Lithuania' (or historically 'Little Poland', as contemporary evidence shows locals made little effort to distinguish the incomers' backgrounds). Factors adversely affecting integration for the first generation of these 'new Scots' included a language barrier, minority religion (most were Catholic) and hostility based on suspicion of taking jobs, undercutting wages and breaking strikes – therefore the Lithuanians in Bellshill and elsewhere tended to identify more closely with the Irish communities of each town who had similar issues. The rise in the migrant population (though severely impacted by the political landscapes of First World War and subsequent Russian Revolution which adversely affected the status of Lithuanians both in their homeland and in Britain) led to the opening of The Scottish Lithuanian Recreation and Social Club on Calder Road in the Mossend area, but much of the culture has faded over the decades, with younger generations sometimes unaware of their family's history due to a desire to assimilate into Scottish life and changes to distinctive surnames (either voluntarily or by obligation). Among the most famous of the descendants of this community was footballer Billy McNeill of Celtic and Scotland, while other mid-20th century players of the same heritage included Andy Swallow, Alex Millar, Matt Balunas and John Jack.

Iron and Steel production were also central to the development of the town. J. B. Neilson, developer of the revolutionary 'hot blast' process, opened the first iron works in the area (Mossend Iron Works) in 1839.

During the industrial boom there were a number of railway stations, including Mossend, Fallside and Bell Cross. The settlement is now served solely by Bellshill railway station.

Maternity services were provided at Bellshill Maternity Hospital until the hospital was closed in 2001.

According to a report by the Halifax Building Society, in the first quarter of 2005 Bellshill was the UK's property hot spot with a 46% rise in house prices. This took the average property price to £105,698 (according to reports published April 2005).

In 2006, a new mosque was opened in the Mossend area of Bellshill becoming one of the largest mosques in Scotland.

The streetscape project, a plan to regenerate and modernise the town centre, commenced Apr 2007 and was completed nearly three years later. The project, created a one way system on the main street with more space for pedestrians.

Education
Bellshill once had six primary schools including Belvidere Primary School. This was closed, however, in early June 2010 and has now been demolished. Holy Family Primary School was founded in 1868 and moved to new buildings in 1907 to accommodate an influx of Lithuanian, Polish and Irish Catholics seeking work in the area. Other primary schools include Sacred Heart Primary, Mossend Primary, Noble Primary, St. Gerard's Primary and Lawmuir Primary. There are two fairly large secondary schools, Bellshill Academy and Cardinal Newman High School.

Religion

Historically a Relief Church for 1000 people was built in Bellshill in 1763. Today several churches serve the town.  St Andrews United Free Church of Scotland sits at Bellshill Cross whilst the Church of Scotland Parish Churches are at opposite ends of the Main Street with Bellshill Central Parish church opposite The Academy, and Bellshill West Parish Church next to the Sir Matt Busby Sports Centre.  The town's Roman Catholic Parish Churches are St Gerard's, Senga Crescent R.A. ,Sacred Heart & Holy Family, Mossend.

Transport
Once heavily reliant on the railways relating to coal mining, Bellshill is still served by a rail junction to the east of Mossend connecting two of the main passenger routes covering southern, western and central Scotland Argyle Line –and Shotts Line – both of which stop at Bellshill railway station in the town centre.

Culture
There is a free public library within the Bellshill Cultural Centre. Various singers, such as Sheena Easton, and sportsmen like Sir Matt Busby and Billy McNeill  
hailed from the town (a statue of McNeill at Bellshill Cross was unveiled in 2022).

Music
Bellshill is also known for its music, especially since the mid-1980s. Bands such as the Soup Dragons, BMX Bandits and Teenage Fanclub put Bellshill on the map as an indie rock hot-spot in Scotland. The scene - known as the Bellshill Sound or the Bellshill Beat - was celebrated by influential DJ John Peel in the Channel 4 television series Sounds Of The Suburbs. Bellshill continues to produce well respected and influential independent pop music, with members of Mogwai and De Rosa hailing from the town.
Sheena Easton was also from the town, and attended Bellshill Academy.

Sport
The town has a football team, Bellshill Athletic, that plays in the Scottish Junior Football West Premier League. They play their home games at Rockburn park after moving away from Tollcross, Glasgow, after New Brandon Park was closed down to reduce costs.

Bellshill also has the Sir Matt Busby Sports Complex (Named after the late Manchester United legend who was born and brought up in the area) that opened in 1995. It has a 25m swimming pool, with two large spectator seating areas either side, a large hall and health suite. The complex also has a gym and a dance studio.

There is a golf course next to nearby Strathclyde Park which is within walking distance of parts of the town, particularly Orbiston. The Greenlink Cycle Path also travels through the golf course and the Orbiston area of Bellshill, heading towards Forgewood.

Notable people from Bellshill
The following list refers to notable people who were born in Bellshill, although they did not necessarily reside there - the town was home to Lanarkshire's maternity hospital in the latter part of the 20th century.

Jackie Bird, journalist and broadcaster
Doug Cameron, Australian politician
Gregory Clark, economist
Thomas Clark, poet
Robin Cook, politician
James Dempsey, politician
Henry Dyer, engineer
Sheena Easton, vocalist
Catherine Grubb, artist
Charles Jeffrey, fashion designer
Bryan Kirkwood, television producer
Monica Lennon, politician
Eric McCormack, writer
John McCusker, musician
Ethel MacDonald, anarchist
Paul McGuigan, filmmaker
David MacMillan, Nobel Prize winning chemist

Billy Moffatt, footballer
David Shaw Nicholls, architect and designer
Sean O'Kane, actor and model
William Orr, trade unionist
John Reid, politician
James Cleland Richardson, soldier – Victoria Cross recipient
Natalie J Robb, actress
Sharleen Spiteri, musician – lead vocalist of Texas
Harry Stanley, innocent man killed by police

Sportspeople
Kenny Arthur, footballer
Tom Birney, American football player
Sir Matt Busby, Scotland international football player and manager
Stuart Carswell, footballer
William Chalmers, football player and manager
Peter Cherrie, footballer
Tom Cowan, footballer
Mike Denness, international cricketer
Alex Dickson, boxer
Scott Fox, footballer
Hughie Gallacher, Scotland international footballer
Peter Grant, Scotland international footballer
Scott Harrison, former world boxing champion
Lee Hollis, footballer
Jackie Hutton, football player and manager
Brian Irvine, Scotland international footballer
Peter Jack, cricketer
Russell Jones, cricketer
Brian Kerr, Scotland international footballer
David Lilley, footballer
Malky Mackay, Scotland international football player and manager
Chris Maguire, Scotland international footballer
Kevin McBride, footballer
Brian McClair, Scotland international footballer
Ally McCoist, Scotland international football player and manager
Lee McCulloch, footballer
Chris McGroarty, footballer
Tom McKean, Olympic track athlete
Billy McNeill, Scotland international football player and manager
James McPake, football player and manager
Hugh Murray, footballer
Alex Neil, football player and manager
Phil O'Donnell, Scotland international footballer
Tommy O'Hara, United States international footballer
Jim Paterson, footballer
Anthony Ralston, footballer
John Rankin, footballer
Shaun Rooney, footballer
Steven Smith, footballer
John Stewart, footballer
Andy Swallow, footballer
Bob Wilson, footballer
Kenny Wright, footballer
Kirsty Gilmour, badminton player

Bands from Bellshill
 BMX Bandits
 Teenage Fanclub
 The Soup Dragons
 De Rosa

References

External links

 2001 Settlement Population - Census data

 
Towns in North Lanarkshire
Mining communities in Scotland